3-(cis-5,6-dihydroxycyclohexa-1,3-dien-1-yl)propanoate dehydrogenase is an enzyme with systematic name . It is produced by the gene . This enzyme catalyses the following chemical reaction:

 (1) 3-(cis-5,6-dihydroxycyclohexa-1,3-dien-1-yl)propanoate + NAD+  3-(2,3-dihydroxyphenyl)propanoate + NADH + H+
 (2) (2E)-3-(cis-5,6-dihydroxycyclohexa-1,3-dien-1-yl)prop-2-enoate + NAD+  (2E)-3-(2,3-dihydroxyphenyl)prop-2-enoate + NADH + H+

This enzyme catalyses a step in indegradation of phenylpropanoid compounds.

References

External links 
 

EC 1.3.1